Travis Dermott (born December 22, 1996) is a Canadian professional ice hockey defenceman for the Vancouver Canucks of the National Hockey League (NHL). Dermott was rated as a top prospect projected as a possible first round pick in the 2015 NHL Entry Draft but was ultimately selected in the second round, 34th overall, by the Toronto Maple Leafs.

In junior, Dermott was drafted by the Erie Otters in the 2012 Ontario Hockey League Draft. His tenure with the team stretched over three seasons and he was named to the 2014 First All-Rookie Team. He has also competed with Canada men's national junior ice hockey team at the 2016 IIHF World U20 Championship. 

After making his professional career debut in 2016 with the Maple Leafs' American Hockey League  (AHL) affiliate, the Toronto Marlies, Dermott was utilized on the team's penalty-kill and moved to the right hand side as a left-handed shot. He made his NHL debut in 2018 and, after losing to the Boston Bruins in the first round, went on to help the Marlies win their first Calder Cup in franchise history.

Early life
Dermott was born on December 22, 1996, in Newmarket, Ontario, Canada to parents Jim and Paula Dermott. He also grew up with an older sister. His mother, who is a retired figure skater, first encouraged him to begin skating before the age of four and eventually signed him up for Timbits hockey. He eventually graduated to the Super 7 Tyke Team in Newmarket by the age of seven with his father as his coach. Growing up, Dermott's favourite team was the Chicago Blackhawks and his favourite player was Duncan Keith. Besides hockey, he also played lacrosse with future Erie Otters teammate Connor McDavid.

Playing career

Youth
Dermott began his youth hockey career with the Minor Midget “AAA” York Simcoe Express. During the 2010–11 season, he broke his collarbone twice causing him to only play in 19 games. During his tenure with the Express, Dermott helped the team win five OMHA championships and an OHF peewee title. Scouts witnessed Dermott's success and he was offered a try out with an East Coast select spring hockey team and signed with the Newmarket Hurricanes in the Ontario Junior Hockey League (OJHL).

He was later drafted by the Erie Otters in the 2012 Ontario Hockey League (OHL) Draft but continued to play with the Newmarket Hurricanes. After being named to the OJHL's 2nd Team All-Stars and Fan Favourite, he committed to play for the Erie Otters on May 4, 2013. During his tenure with the Otters, Dermott attended McDowell High School and was named Midwest Division Academic Player of the Month for January 2014. Following a strong first year performance with the Erie Otters in which he scored 28 points in 67 games, Dermott was rewarded when he was named to the 2013–14 OHL First All-Rookie Team. 
 
During following season, Dermott scored 45 points in 61 games, including a franchise record seven-game assist streak which was the longest such stretch by a defenceman. He also led all Erie defencemen in playoff scoring with 17 points earning him a jump in ratings and a projection as a possible first round pick. Dermott attested his scoring prowess as the result of filling in for a suspended Kurtis MacDermid and practicing with former NHL defenceman Jay McKee. The NHL Central Scouting Bureau ranked Dermott 46th amongst North American skaters, a boost from his midterm ranking of 47. 

Dermott was eventually drafted 34th overall by the Toronto Maple Leafs in the 2015 NHL Entry Draft and signed a three-year, entry-level contract with them on July 22, 2015. Prior to his draft, Dermott began training with Dave Harris at Iperformance. He returned to the Otters for his final year of major junior hockey after attending the Leafs training camp. On December 1, 2015, Dermott and teammate Dylan Strome were selected to compete with Team Canada at the 2016 World Junior Ice Hockey Championships. Upon returning from Finland empty handed, Dermott was ejected from a game against the Mississauga Steelheads for a hit to the head on Owen Tippett. After the game concluded, he was assessed a five game suspension following a hearing. Although the Otters qualified for the 2016 OHL Playoffs, they were swept in the OHLs Western Conference final by the London Knights.

Professional

Toronto Maple Leafs
After the Otters were swept in the Western Conference final, Dermott joined the Toronto Marlies for the 2016 Calder Cup playoffs. He made his professional post-season debut with the Marlies during the third round of the playoffs as a replacement for Stuart Percy before they were ultimately eliminated by the Hershey Bears. 

On August 26, 2016, Dermott was selected to compete at the Maple Leafs 2016 Rookie Tournament and their 2016 training camp. After participating in both, he was returned to the Toronto Marlies for their 2016–17 season. Dermott made his AHL debut on October 16, 2016, where he recorded his first career AHL goal and assist in a win against the Utica Comets. He concluded his rookie season with the Marlies having recorded 24 points in 59 games, earning him a second-place finish amongst Marlies defensemen in scoring.

The following year, Dermott was again selected to participate in the Leafs Rookie Tournament, but was reassigned to the Marlies to begin the season. He played on a defensive pairing with Timothy Liljegren and earned time on the penalty-kill. Although he was a left-handed shooter, he was moved to the right hand side. Dermott's playmaking ability earned him his first NHL recall on January 5, 2018 where he recorded one assist in two games before being sent back down to the Marlies on January 11, 2018. While with the Marlies again, Dermott was named to the 2018 AHL All-Star Classic alongside teammate Kasperi Kapanen.  Following another recall on January 15 with fellow Marlies player Frédérik Gauthier, he was given the number 23 to wear instead of his usual 3. That night, he scored his first career NHL goal in the leafs 5–0 win against the New York Islanders on January 31. Dermott stayed will the Leafs as they qualified for the 2018 Stanley Cup playoffs against the Boston Bruins and recorded his first playoff goal during Game 7 to tie the game 3–3, although the Leafs ended up losing the game 7–4. Despite playing in the NHL playoff series, Dermott, Andreas Johnsson, and Kasperi Kapanen remained eligible to compete in the 2018 Calder Cup playoffs. After the Leafs were eliminated from the playoffs, Dermott was sent to the Marlies to help them in their 2018 Calder Cup playoffs run. He ended his rookie campaign with the Leafs recording one goal and 12 assists in 37 regular season games. Upon returning to the Toronto Marlies lineup, he helped them win their first Calder Cup in franchise history following a seven–game playoff series against the Texas Stars.

On the heels of his successful rookie campaign, Dermott began the 2018–19 season with the Leafs in the NHL for the first time in his career. As the youngest defenseman on the Leafs roster, Dermott played on a pairing with Ron Hainsey with the goal of moving him to Morgan Rielly's side. Former head coach Mike Babcock stated that “[Dermott’s issues] are all the things that are no different than Morgan Rielly....Everyone raves about you, but you’re a dash all the time. The puck is going in your net all the time. So you have to figure that out over time. That’s what the league is all about.” He played in 24 games until teammate William Nylander returned to the lineup following a contract dispute on December 2, 2018. Dermott was loaned to the Marlies temporarily to make room for Nylander in the Leafs lineup but returned for their following game against the Buffalo Sabres. Upon returning, he continued to play with the Leafs until February 27, 2019, when he suffered a shoulder injury. As a result, he was out of the lineup for a month before eventually returning to finish the regular season and playoffs with the Leafs. He underwent shoulder surgery during the offseason after the Leafs were eliminated in the first round the 2019 Stanley Cup playoffs.

Although the 2019–20 season would eventually be delayed due to COVID-19, Dermott began the season in late October as he recovered from his surgery in May. In the final year of his contract, Dermott began seeing playing time on the top defenceman pairing after Morgan Rielly and Jake Muzzin suffered injuries. Following the hiring of Sheldon Keefe, who Dermott played under with the Marlies, he was paired with Justin Holl to replace those on the top pair. Although he was again shortly sidelined due to an illness, he only missed one game to recover.  Under the guidance of Keefe, Dermott averaged nearly 19 minutes of ice time per game playing beside Holl and helped the team outscore opponents 4-1.

On October 23, 2020, Dermott signed a one-year, $874,125 contract extension with the Maple Leafs.

On July 8, 2021, Dermott signed a two-year, $3 million extension with the Maple Leafs.

Vancouver Canucks
On March 20, 2022, one day before the trade deadline, Dermott was traded by the Maple Leafs to the Vancouver Canucks, in exchange for a 2022 third-round draft pick.

Personal life
Dermott and his dog Niylah appeared in a dog food commercial for Nulo and work as ambassadors. He also signed a multi-year contract with Levelwear Pro-Sports business and club partnership.

He earned the nickname "Skin Doctor" from the Toronto Maple Leafs as a play on his last name Dermott into dermatologist.

Career statistics

Regular season and playoffs

International

Awards and honours

References

External links

 

1996 births
Living people
Abbotsford Canucks players
Canadian expatriate ice hockey players in the United States
Canadian ice hockey defencemen
Erie Otters players
Ice hockey people from Ontario
Sportspeople from Newmarket, Ontario
Toronto Maple Leafs draft picks
Toronto Maple Leafs players
Toronto Marlies players
Vancouver Canucks players